Marco Eduardo Vanzini Casteres (born 19 April 1976) is a Uruguayan retired footballer who played as a defensive midfielder.

Club career
In his country Vanzini represented hometown sides Danubio F.C. and Club Nacional de Football, playing in two different spells for the latter and winning a total of five first division championships. Nicknamed Palillo, he first joined Nacional in 1988, and he made his last appearance for the club in 2007.

Abroad, his first experience came in 1996, playing a couple of months with Argentina's Club Atlético Banfield. From 2003 to 2005 different fates befell him, as he helped Portuguese team S.C. Braga finish fifth and qualify for the UEFA Cup, subsequently relegating in Spain with second level's Terrassa FC.

After two more years at Nacional, Vanzini played briefly in Brazil for Esporte Clube Juventude (top division, relegation) at age 31. He retired in 2009 at the age of 33, after two seasons in Saudi Arabia with Al-Hilal FC.

International career
During one year, in the beginning of his professional career, Vanzini made three appearances for Uruguay, his debut coming in 1995.

References

External links

 
National team data 

1976 births
Living people
Footballers from Montevideo
Uruguayan footballers
Association football midfielders
Uruguayan Primera División players
Danubio F.C. players
Club Nacional de Football players
Argentine Primera División players
Club Atlético Banfield footballers
Primeira Liga players
S.C. Braga players
Segunda División players
Terrassa FC footballers
Campeonato Brasileiro Série A players
Esporte Clube Juventude players
Al Hilal SFC players
Uruguay international footballers
Uruguayan expatriate footballers
Expatriate footballers in Argentina
Expatriate footballers in Portugal
Expatriate footballers in Spain
Expatriate footballers in Brazil
Expatriate footballers in Saudi Arabia
Uruguayan expatriate sportspeople in Portugal
Uruguayan people of Italian descent